Fort Ogden is an unincorporated community in DeSoto County, Florida, United States, located approximately  southwest of the city of Arcadia. U.S. Route 17 and the Fort Myers Division of the Seminole Gulf Railway pass through the community, and break away from each other.

The communities name is taken from a U.S. Army post established in 1841 during the Second Seminole War located within the community.

References

Unincorporated communities in DeSoto County, Florida
Unincorporated communities in Florida
Former municipalities in Florida